A.C. Perugia finished tenth in Serie A, and reached the semis of the Coppa Italia in a successful season by the club's standards.

The season started off with much negative publicity for club president Luciano Gaucci, when he decided to let South Korean striker Ahn Jung-Hwan go, following the Korean's winning goal against Italy in the FIFA World Cup.

In the season itself, Perugia fought in the middle of the table all year, but ended only four points above the dropzone, and in the end relied on inspired performances against top sides to seal the contract. Perugia's highlight of the season was a 4–1 victory against Inter, but it also beat Milan and drew at champions Juventus's home.

Its two most fancied players, Fabrizio Miccoli and Manuele Blasi were both bought by Juventus following the season, Miccoli being hailed as one of the season's major breakthroughs. Despite interest from top clubs, Perugia was able to keep right-back Zé Maria, who grew in importance during the season.

Squad

Goalkeepers
  Željko Kalac
  Sebastiano Rossi
  Michele Tardioli

Defenders
  Zé Maria
  Marco Di Loreto
  Mauro Milanese
  Fabio Grosso
  Sean Sogliano
  Rahman Rezaei
  William Viali
  Konstantinos Loumpoutis

Midfielders
  Christian Obodo
  Manuele Blasi
  Giovanni Tedesco
  Massimiliano Fusani
  Luigi Pagliuca
  Roberto Baronio
  Giovanni Sulcis
  Fabio Gatti

Attackers
  Fabrizio Miccoli
  Zisis Vryzas
  Andrea Caracciolo
  Emanuele Berrettoni
  Nicola Amoruso
  Antonio Criniti
  Lorenzo Crocetti

Competitions

Serie A

League table

Matches

Top scorers

  Fabrizio Miccoli 9
  Zé Maria 6
  Zisis Vryzas 5
  Fabio Grosso 4
  Giovanni Tedesco 3

Sources
  RSSSF - Italy 2002/03

A.C. Perugia Calcio seasons
Perugia